The men's super heavyweight competition in kickboxing at the 2017 World Games took place from 26 to 27 July 2017 at the Orbita Hall in Wrocław, Poland.

Guto Inocente from Brazil had originally won gold medal in this event, but he was later disqualified because of doping.

Competition format
A total of 8 athletes entered the competition. They fought in the cup system.

Results

References 

 
2017 World Games